The War Show is a 2016 Syrian-Danish-German documentary film co-written and directed by  and Obaidah Zytoon. It was awarded best film in the Venice Days section at the 73rd edition of the Venice Film Festival.

The film recounts the Arab Spring days in Syria and the subsequent civil war though the eyes of a Syrian former radio DJ.

References

External links 
 

2016 documentary films
Best Documentary Bodil Award winners
Danish documentary films
Documentary films about the Syrian civil war
German documentary films
Syrian documentary films
2010s German films
Films scored by Colin Stetson